Daniel Morad (born April 24, 1990) is a Canadian-Assyrian racecar driver. He is notable for winning the 2007 American Formula BMW championship; the 2010 World Championship in the Rotax Max Challenge Grand Finals in La Conca, Italy; the 2016 Ultra 94 Porsche GT3 Cup Platinum Cup; and the 2017 Rolex 24 Hours of Daytona with Alegra Motorsports.

Career

Karting and Formula BMW
Morad was born  in Markham, Ontario, Canada. His career began in his native country during 1998 competing in several karting events. In his eight-year career in karts, Morad picked up a number of trophies, including the Canadian Formula Senior Championship and a Florida Winter Tour champion title, in the Pro-Shifter class, both of which were won in his final year in karting, 2005. He then moved up into Formula racing the following year in the form of Formula BMW, competing in its American series. In his début season, in which he participated in all fourteen rounds, he picked up a win in Mid-Ohio, a pole position, a fastest lap and a podium at the Lime Rock Park meeting. With a collection of 75 points, Morad finished 6th overall in the Drivers' Championship.

He switched teams the following year, joining the Italian EuroInternational. he won the title that year, taking six wins of a possible fourteen and scoring 523 points, more than the previous year albeit with a more generous points system than the previous year, nearly 100 points clear of runner-up Mexican Esteban Gutiérrez. 2007 also saw Morad drive for the Canadian A1 Grand Prix team taking the role of test driver at the South African, Mexican, Chinese and British meetings.

Atlantic Championship
With his Formula BMW USA title on his Résumé, Morad managed to get a drive at the EuroInternational Atlantic Championship team alongside Venezuelan Luis Schiavo. He finished 12th in the championship after leaving the team and the series with three races remaining in the season. He was 10th at the time. His best finish was 6th at Long Beach and the Grand Prix de Trois-Rivières.

A1 Grand Prix – The World Cup of Motorsport
Morad raced for A1 Team Lebanon in the 2008–09 season. Although having previously driven in rookie sessions for A1 Team Canada, his grandfather was Lebanese and his father also was born in Lebanon so he was able to switch teams. He completed every race for the team and scored 8 points, putting A1 Team Lebanon in 17th overall. Morad's best finish was 6th in the South African feature race.

GP3 Series
With A1GP's closing at the end of the season, Morad did not drive in any other series in 2009 but joined Status Grand Prix in the GP3 Series for 2010. He finished 12th in the GP3 series standings, and won the Silverstone sprint race. After sitting out the first round of the 2011 GP3 Series season, Daniel Morad signed on to contest the remainder of the season with Carlin Motorsport. However, Morad parted ways with the team in July and was replaced by Callum MacLeod.

Indy Lights
Morad raced in the 2011 Firestone Indy Lights series with Team Moore Racing for one event in Edmonton.

Ultra 94 Porsche GT3 Cup Challenge Canada by Yokohama
Morad was given a second chance at a career when a cold call to the Alegra Motorsports team landed him a spot in the team's line up, just 1 week before the opening race at Canadian Tire Motorsport Park. He scored an impressive double podium in his first race with a roof over his head. He went on to scoring a total of 9 podiums in 10 races, one of which being a dominant win on the streets of Toronto in torrential conditions. One DNF in Round 3 of the championship ultimately cost him the title in his debut season. Morad's efforts were enough to land him an opportunity to participate in the exclusive Porsche Young Drivers Academy.

Morad bounced back to win the 2016 Platinum class championship despite strong challenges from Scott Hargrove and Zacharie Robichon.

Porsche Carrera Cup Great Britain
At the end of his 2015 campaign, Morad got a call from championship winning team, Samsung SUHD TV Racing, to sub in for the final 4 rounds of the championship, which helped the team jump from 3rd to 2nd place in the team championship.

NASCAR
Morad competed in two NASCAR Pinty's Series events in 2016. He made his debut at Toronto driving the No. 06 Dodge, he started 3rd and finished 7th after leading 5 laps. Morad returned at Circuit Trois-Rivières, where he finished 5th.

IMSA WeatherTech SportsCar Championship
In 2016 Daniel Morad competed in the 12 Hours of Sebring driving the #24 Alegra Motorsports InSync Riley/BMW Daytona Prototype. He brought the team up to 3rd place overall, just past the halfway point of the race in difficult conditions. Unfortunately, shortly after Morad jumped out of the car, the team ran into some trouble on track with slower traffic and then some electrical issues.

In 2017 he competed full time in the IMSA WeatherTech SportsCar Championship with Alegra Motorsport driving the #28 Porsche 991 GT3 R. He won the Rolex 24 at Daytona in the GTD category for Alegra Motorsports together with Carlos de Quesada, Jesse Lazare, Michael de Quesada and Michael Christensen and finished 9th in the GTD drivers Championship.

In 2018 he drove two IMSA WeatherTech SportsCar Championship races with two different teams. He competed in the 2018 Sahlen's six hours of the Glen driving the #71 Mercedes-AMG GT3 for P1 Motorsports with Loris Spinelli and JC Perez. They retired after 48 laps. He also drove the #29 Audi R8 LMS with Kelvin van der Linde and Christopher Mies for Montaplast by Land Motorsport at the 2018 Petit le mans, finishing the race 26th overall and 6th in class.

In 2019 he competed in the Michelin Endurance Cup with Montaplast by Land Motorsport scoring a best finish of 19th overall and 2nd in class at the 2019 Petit le mans.

In 2020 he competed in the Rolex 24 at Daytona for WRT Speedstar Audi Sport driving the #88 Audi R8 LMS GT3 with Rolf Ineichen, Mirko Bortolotti and Dries Vanthoor. They ended up finishing 20th overall and 3rd in class.

For the 2023 24 Hours of Daytona, Morad was drafted in to replace Lucas Auer for Winward Racing after Auer suffered a back injury in a practice crash.

Personal life
Morad was born in the spring of 1990 in Ontario to Robin and Ramsin Morad. He has one sister, Kayla.

Racing record

Racing career summary

Complete GP3 Series results
(key) (Races in bold indicate pole position) (Races in italics indicate fastest lap)

Complete WeatherTech SportsCar Championship results
(key) (Races in bold indicate pole position; results in italics indicate fastest lap)

References

External links
 Official website
 Profile on Driver Database
 
 Profile on ChampCar Atlantic Official website
Profile on imsa.com

1990 births
Living people
People from Markham, Ontario
Racing drivers from Ontario
Canadian racing drivers
Lebanese racing drivers
Formula BMW USA drivers
Atlantic Championship drivers
A1 Team Lebanon drivers
Canadian GP3 Series drivers
Indy Lights drivers
NASCAR drivers
Canadian people of Lebanese descent
WeatherTech SportsCar Championship drivers
Porsche Carrera Cup GB drivers
24 Hours of Daytona drivers
Carlin racing drivers
GT World Challenge America drivers
Mercedes-AMG Motorsport drivers
Status Grand Prix drivers
EuroInternational drivers
Team Moore Racing drivers
W Racing Team drivers
Extreme Speed Motorsports drivers
Michelin Pilot Challenge drivers
Craft-Bamboo Racing drivers

https://www.driverdb.com/championships/standings/porsche-gt3-cup-challenge-canada/2016/